Carlos Miguel dos Santos Franco Garrocho (born 26 January 1974) is an Angolan retired footballer who played as a midfielder, winger, and attacker. Spending nearly his entire career in Portugal, Garrocho earned one cap for the Angola national team in 2002.

Career
Garrocho started his career with C.D. Arrifanense. In 2001, he signed for Walsall in the English Football League First Division, where he made five appearances and scored zero goals. After that, he played for Portuguese clubs Lusitânia and Famalicão before retiring.

References

External links
 Football: Lee gives Garrocho fitness opportunity
 Football: Garrocho adds to Saddlers continuing injury woes 
 Diary - Tuesday 13 July 2004 
 ForaDeJogo.net Profile 
 

Living people
1974 births
Angolan footballers
People from Benguela
Association football utility players
C.D. Feirense players
Leça F.C. players
Walsall F.C. players
Lusitânia F.C. players
F.C. Famalicão players
F.C. Tirsense players
Segunda Divisão players
Liga Portugal 2 players
English Football League players
Angola international footballers
Angolan expatriate footballers
Expatriate footballers in Portugal
Angolan expatriate sportspeople in Portugal
Expatriate footballers in England
Angolan expatriate sportspeople in England